The Sony FE 90mm F2.8 Macro G OSS is a full-frame macro prime lens for the Sony E-mount, announced by Sony on 4 March 2015.

As of June 2017, the 90mm Macro lens is one of only 3 E-mount lenses manufactured by Sony that are specifically designed for macro photography, with the others being the Sony FE 50mm F2.8 Macro and Sony E 30mm F3.5 Macro lenses. Though designed for Sony's full frame E-mount cameras, this lens can be used on Sony's APS-C E-mount camera bodies, producing a field-of-view equivalent on full frame of 135mm.

Build quality
The lens features a weather resistant plastic exterior with a matte black finish. The lens is currently the only Sony E-mount lens to feature an external focusing ring, which can be pulled up or down relative to the lens body to switch quickly between manual and autofocus. On the side of the lens are a pair of external switches controlling the lens' focusing range and image stabilization.

The lens' autofocus motor is fast and accurate on all Sony E-mount cameras, with only mild hunting when shooting at its closest focusing distance in low-light situations.

Image quality
The lens has exceptional sharpness straight from its maximum aperture of f/2.8, with very little chromatic aberration, distortion, and vignetting.

See also
List of Sony E-mount lenses

References

External links

 (Comment: As of 2015-07-18, some of the data given in this article is incorrect.)

Camera lenses introduced in 2015
90
Macro lenses